Long Sault 12 is a First Nations reserve in northwestern Ontario. It is one of the reserves of the Rainy River First Nations.

References

Saulteaux reserves in Ontario
Communities in Rainy River District